Mathrubhumi is a Malayalam newspaper that is published from Kerala, India. It was founded by K. P. Kesava Menon, an active volunteer in the Indian freedom struggle against the British. The word "Mathrubhumi" translates to 'mother land'. It is the second most widely read newspaper daily in Kerala. It publishes a variety of magazines and supplements including the weekly literary magazine, Mathrubhumi Azhchappathippu.

Printing centers (known as editions)

Kozhikode,Kannur,Malappuram,Palakkad,Thrissur,Kochi,Kottayam,Alappuzha,Kollam,Thiruvananthapuram

Publications 
Arogyamasika (health publication)
Balabhumi (children's publication)
Cartoon Plus
Grihalakshmi (women's publication)
Mathrubhumi Azhchappathippu (illustrated weekly)
Mathrubhumi Sports Masika (sports publication in Malayalam)
Mathrubhumi (complete multipurpose portal) 
Mathrubhumi Yearbook Plus – Malayalam 
Mathrubhumi Yearbook Plus – English 
Mathrubhumi Yathra (travel magazine)
Minnaminni (for pre-primary/lower primary children)
Thozhilvartha (weekly for job prospects; the leading career weekly in India)
Mathrubhumi Star & Style (a complete magazine covering film, fashion And lifestyle)
Mathrubhumi GK & Current Affairs (a portal to the world)

See also
List of Malayalam language newspapers
Malayalam journalism
Mathrubhumi News channel
Mathrubhumi Club FM 94.3
Mathrubhumi Kappa TV
Live Mathrubhumi TV

References

External links
 
 Mathrubhumi Yathra
 Magazines | Mathrubhumi
 News about Mathrubhumi on Hindustan Times
 Malayalam News

Daily newspapers published in India
Malayalam-language newspapers
Mass media in Kerala
Companies based in Kozhikode
1923 establishments in India
Publications established in 1923
Indian news websites